The women's 49er FX competition at the 2018 Asian Games was held from 24 to 31 August 2018.

Schedule
All times are Western Indonesia Time (UTC+07:00)

Results
Legend
DNF — Did not finish
DSQ — Disqualification

References

External links
Official website

Women's 49er FX